The Soyuz-L (meaning "union"), GRAU index 11A511L was a Soviet expendable carrier rocket designed by OKB-1 and manufactured by State Aviation Plant No. 1 in Samara, Russia. It was created to test the LK lunar lander in low Earth orbit, as part of the Soviet lunar programme.

The Soyuz-L was a derivative of the original Soyuz rocket featuring the reinforced first stage and boosters supporting the Molniya-M's third stage, so that it could carry a more massive payload. A larger payload fairing was also fitted, to accommodate the LK spacecraft. The Soyuz-L was only launched three times between 1970 and 1971, all successful. The later Soyuz-U used a similar configuration to the Soyuz-L.

References

1970 in spaceflight
1971 in spaceflight
R-7 (rocket family)
Space launch vehicles of the Soviet Union
Vehicles introduced in 1970